Alana Mychal Haim (born December 15, 1991) is an American musician and actress. She is a member of the pop rock band Haim, along with her two older sisters Este and Danielle, where she performs piano, guitar and vocals. In 2020, the band received a Grammy Award for Album of the Year nomination for their third album, Women in Music Pt. III.

In 2021, Haim starred in Paul Thomas Anderson's film Licorice Pizza, for which she received critical acclaim and was nominated for a Golden Globe Award for Best Actress – Motion Picture Comedy or Musical, and a BAFTA Award for Best Actress in a Leading Role.

Early life 
Alana Haim was born on December 15, 1991, in Los Angeles to a Jewish family. Her father, Mordechai "Moti" Haim, is an Israeli-born retired professional soccer player who moved to the United States in 1980. Her mother, Donna Rose, is a former elementary school art teacher from Philadelphia. Haim's paternal grandmother was originally from Bulgaria. She has two older sisters, Este (born 1986) and Danielle (born 1989).

Haim was raised in the San Fernando Valley in a musical family. Her father was a drummer in a choir group; her mother was a folk singer, and a winning contestant on The Gong Show in the 1970s. They taught their young daughters to play various instruments, with Alana picking up percussion at the age of four. Growing up, the siblings were encouraged to listen to their parents' classic rock and Americana records, though they also developed their own liking of '90s R&B. The family eventually formed a band, Rockinhaim, and played their first rock concert at Los Angeles' Canter's Deli in 2000, with Moti on drums and Donna on vocals. They performed  '70s and '80s rock covers every few months in the next decade, mostly at local fairs and fundraisers.

Haim attended Los Angeles County High School for the Arts and graduated in 2010. She briefly attended Los Angeles Valley College before dropping out to focus on her music career.

Career

Haim 

In 2007, Alana and her sisters formed the band Haim and released their EP Forever in 2012. They have appeared at many music festivals, one of which brought them to the attention of artist and musician Jay-Z, who signed them to his recently founded label Roc Nation in 2012. Haim signed with Columbia Records at the end of 2012, and was a featured artist at Jay Z's Made in America festival. Haim released their first studio album, Days Are Gone, in September 2013. It was a commercial success, and they were musical guests on Saturday Night Live. They released their second studio album, Something to Tell You, in July 2017. In June 2020, they released their third album, Women in Music, Pt. III, which was nominated for Album of the Year at the 63rd Annual Grammy Awards, with the single, "The Steps", nominated for Best Rock Performance. The album was widely featured on year-end best album lists, including those of The Guardian, NPR, Pitchfork and Stereogum.

Acting 
Haim stars in Licorice Pizza, a 2021 feature film directed by Paul Thomas Anderson, who previously directed several of the band's music videos and a short documentary on the making of Something to Tell You. Licorice Pizza is set in the 1970s, where Haim plays opposite Cooper Hoffman, the son of Anderson's late collaborator Philip Seymour Hoffman. Reviewing the film in the Los Angeles Times, Justin Chang called Haim "the star of this boisterous, bighearted movie and its raison d'être". In The Hollywood Reporter, David Rooney praised her performance as "an incandescent presence that marks the arrival of a fully formed screen star". For her performance she was nominated for a Golden Globe Award for Best Actress – Motion Picture Comedy or Musical, a BAFTA Award for Best Actress in a Leading Role and a Critics' Choice Movie Award for Best Actress.

Haim lives in Los Angeles.

Filmography

Awards and nominations 
For her awards and nominations as a member of Haim, see: List of awards and nominations received by Haim

References

External links 

 

1991 births
Living people
Musicians from Los Angeles
American people of Israeli descent
American pianists
Singer-songwriters from California
Jewish American musicians
American women guitarists
Women pianists
Los Angeles County High School for the Arts alumni
21st-century American Jews
21st-century American women
American people of Bulgarian-Jewish descent
Actresses from California
Actresses from Los Angeles
Actresses from Los Angeles County, California